The 2022–23 season is FC Noah's 5th season in Armenian Premier League.

Season events

Squad

Transfers

In

Loans in

Out

Loans out

Released

Friendlies

Competitions

Overall record

Premier League

Results summary

Results by round

Results

Table

Armenian Cup

Statistics

Appearances and goals

|-
|colspan="16"|Players away on loan:

|-
|colspan="16"|Players who left Noah during the season:

|}

Goal scorers

Clean sheets

Disciplinary record

References

FC Noah seasons
Noah